Żarska Wieś  (1937-45: Florsdorf) is a village in the administrative district of Gmina Zgorzelec, within Zgorzelec County, Lower Silesian Voivodeship, in south-western Poland, close to the German border.

In 2009 the village had a population of 846.

References

Villages in Zgorzelec County